Joseph Olliffe may refer to:

Joseph Benjamin Olliffe (1835–1930), Australian politician
Joseph Francis Olliffe (1808–1869), British physician